The United States twenty-dollar bill ($20) is a denomination of U.S. currency. A portrait of Andrew Jackson, the seventh U.S. president (1829–1837), has been featured on the obverse of the bill since 1928; the White House is featured on the reverse.

As of December 2018, the average life of a $20 bill in circulation is 7.8 years before it is replaced due to wear. Twenty-dollar bills are delivered by Federal Reserve Banks in violet straps.

History

Large-sized notes
  The back is printed green.
  The back is different, with several small variations extant.
  The reverse has a $20 gold coin and various abstract elements. The back is orange.
 
  The back design is green.
 
  The back design is black.
  The back is orange and features an eagle.
  The front is similar, but the back is different and printed in brown.
 
  Two different backs exist both with abstract designs.
  The front features Hugh McCulloch, and the back has a vignette of an allegorical America.
  The back design is orange.

Small size notes 

Andrew Jackson has appeared on the $20 bill since the series of 1928. The placement of Jackson on the $20 bill is considered ironic; as president, he vehemently opposed both the National Bank and use of paper money. After the president of the Second Bank of the United States, Nicholas Biddle, defied Jackson and requested the renewal of the charter of the Second Bank in an election year, Jackson responded by making it a goal of his administration to destroy the National Bank.  Jackson prevailed over Biddle, and the absence of the Second Bank contributed to a real estate bubble in the mid-1830s. The bubble collapsed in the Panic of 1837, leading to a deep depression.

Given Jackson’s opposition to the concept of a National Bank, his presence on the $20 bill was controversial from the start. When pressed to reveal why the various images were chosen for the new bills, Treasury officials denied there was any political motivation. Instead, they insisted that the images were based only on their relative familiarity to the public. An article in the June 30, 1929 issue of the New York Times, stated “The Treasury Department maintains stoutly that the men chosen for small bills, which are naturally the ones in most demand, were so placed because their faces were most familiar to the majority of people.” It is also true that 1928 coincides with the 100th anniversary of Jackson's election as president, but no evidence has surfaced that would suggest that this was a factor in the decision. According to more recent inquiries of the U.S. Treasury: "Treasury Department records do not reveal the reason that portraits of these particular statesmen were chosen in preference to those of other persons of equal importance and prominence."

 1914: Began as a large-sized note, a portrait of Grover Cleveland on the face, and, on the back, a steam locomotive and an automobile approaching from the left, and a steamship approaching from the right.
 
 1928: Switched to a small-sized note with a portrait of Andrew Jackson on the face and the south view of the White House on the reverse. The banknote is redeemable in gold or silver (at the bearer's discretion) at any Federal Reserve Bank.
 1933: With the U.S. having abandoned the gold standard, the bill is no longer redeemable in gold, but rather in "lawful money", meaning silver.
 1942: A special emergency series, with brown serial numbers and "HAWAII" overprinted on both the front and the back, is issued. These notes were designed to circulate on the Hawaiian islands and could be rendered  worthless in the event of a Japanese invasion.
 1948: The White House rendering on the reverse of the bill was updated to reflect renovations to the building itself, including the addition of the Truman Balcony, as well as the passage of time. Most notably, the trees are larger. The change occurred during production of Series 1934C.
 1950: Design elements such as the treasury and Federal Reserve seals are reduced in size and repositioned subtly, presumably for aesthetic reasons.
 1963: "Will Pay To The Bearer On Demand" is removed from the front of the bill and the legal tender designation is shortened to "This note is legal tender for all debts, public and private" (eliminating "and is redeemable in lawful money at the United States Treasury, or at any Federal Reserve Bank.") Also, "In God We Trust" is added above the White House on the reverse. These two acts (one taking U.S. currency off the silver backing, and the other authorizing the national motto) are coincidental, even if their combined result is implemented in one redesign. Also, several design elements are rearranged, less perceptibly than the changes in 1950, mostly to make room for the slightly rearranged obligations.
 1969: The new treasury seal appears on all denominations, including the $20.
  The old presses are gradually retired, and old-style serial numbers appear as late as 1981 for this denomination.
  Production of Series 1990 bills began in April 1992.
 1994: The first $20 notes produced at the Western Currency Facility in Fort Worth, Texas are printed in January 1994, late during production of Series 1990.
 1998: The Series 1996 $20 note was completely redesigned for the first time since 1929 to further deter counterfeiting; A larger, off-center portrait of Jackson was used and the view of the White House on the reverse of the bill was changed from the south portico to the north. Several new anti-counterfeiting features were added, including color-shifting ink, microprinting, and a watermark. The plastic strip now reads "USA 20" and glows green under a black light. Production of Series 1996 $20 notes began in June,1998.
 2003: The redesigned Series 2004 20 dollar note is released with light background shading in green and yellow, and no oval around Andrew Jackson's portrait (background images of eagles, etc. were also added to the obverse); the reverse features the same view of the White House, but without an oval around it. Ninety faint "20"s are scattered on the back in yellow as a "EURion constellation" to prevent photocopying. Production of Series 2004 $20 notes began in April, 2003.

Series dates

Small size

Proposal for a woman's portrait
In a campaign called "Women on 20s", selected voters were asked to choose three of 15 female candidates to have a portrait on the  bill. The goal was to have a woman on the  bill by 2020, the centennial of the 19th Amendment which gave women the right to vote. Among the candidates on the petition were Harriet Tubman, Eleanor Roosevelt, Rosa Parks, and Wilma Mankiller, the first female chief of the Cherokee Nation.

On May 12, 2015, Tubman was announced as the winning candidate of that "grassroots" poll with more than 600,000 people surveyed and more than 118,000 choosing Tubman, followed by Roosevelt, Parks and Mankiller.

On June 17, 2015, Treasury Secretary Jack Lew announced that a woman's portrait would be featured on a redesigned  bill by 2020, replacing Alexander Hamilton. However, that decision was reversed, at least in part due to Hamilton's surging popularity following the hit Broadway musical Hamilton.

On April 20, 2016, Lew officially announced that Alexander Hamilton would remain on the  bill, while Andrew Jackson would be replaced by Tubman on the front of the  bill, with Jackson appearing on the reverse. Lew simultaneously announced that the five- and ten-dollar bills would also be redesigned in the coming years and put into production in the next decade.

Trump administration
While campaigning for president, Donald Trump responded to the announcement that Tubman would replace Jackson on the twenty-dollar bill. The day following the announcement Trump called Tubman "fantastic", but stated that he would oppose replacing Jackson with Tubman, calling the replacement "pure political correctness", and suggested that Tubman could perhaps be put on another denomination instead.

On August 31, 2017, Treasury Secretary Steven Mnuchin said that he would not commit to putting Tubman on the twenty-dollar bill, explaining "People have been on the bills for a long period of time. This is something we'll consider; right now we have a lot more important issues to focus on." According to a Bureau of Engraving and Printing spokesperson, the next redesigned bill will be the ten-dollar bill, not set to be released into circulation until at least 2026.

In May 2019, Mnuchin stated that no new imagery will be unveiled until 2026, and that a new bill will not go into circulation until 2028. In making the announcement, Mnuchin blamed the delay on technical reasons. However, an employee within the Bureau of Engraving and Printing told the New York Times that at the time of the announcement "the design appeared to be far along in the process." Democratic members of the House of Representatives asked Mnuchin to provide more specific reasons for the delay. In June, the Treasury Department's acting inspector general, Rich Delmar, announced his office would conduct an investigation into what caused the delay in production of the new bill featuring Tubman.

Biden administration 
In January 2021, White House Press Secretary Jen Psaki said President Joe Biden will accelerate the Tubman redesign. However, the Tubman redesign is unlikely to be released until at least 2030.

See also
 Twenty Bucks, a 1993 movie that follows the travels of a $20 bill.

References

External links

$20 Notes

1861 establishments in the United States
Currencies introduced in 1861
Cultural depictions of Andrew Jackson
020
Twenty-base-unit banknotes
White House